The 2007 Grand Prix of Cleveland is the fifth round of the 2007 Champ Car World Series Season.  It was held on June 24 at the Burke Lakefront Airport, in Cleveland, Ohio.

Qualifying results

Sébastien Bourdais lead both Friday and Saturday's qualification sessions.  Rookie Simon Pagenaud missed the pole by .025 of a second to score his first Champ Car front row starting position next to Bourdais.  Bourdais chose to start from the left side of the track, opposite the traditional inside position leading to Cleveland's often frantic first turn.

Race

An incident-filled race ended with a surprise winner in Paul Tracy, his first victory since the 2005 Cleveland Grand Prix and 31st overall.  Despite two early crashes which forced him to pit and have his crew replace his nose cone twice, Tracy managed to stay on the lead lap.  Tracy found himself in lead on lap 70 during the last yellow flag period.  The extra fuel he gained by his two early pit stops allowed him to gamble on fuel strategy.  Robert Doornbos, recovering from an early setback of his own after he was black-flagged for blocking, was catching up to him quickly in the final laps but was unable to pass Tracy before the checkered flag after 89 laps.

Early in the race it looked as if the race would come down to a showdown between Will Power and Sébastien Bourdais as they raced nose to tail, with Bourdais leading from the standing start.  Power, following the script Bourdais ran to in the Portland race, passed Bourdais after the first round of pit stops by staying out an extra lap.  But the battle was aborted when Bourdais' car broke down on lap 67.  Not long later, Power was forced to pit under green on lap 75 to change a tire that failed because of a broken valve.

Caution flags

Notes

 New Race Record: Paul Tracy 1:45:10.860

Championship standings after the race

Drivers' Championship standings

 Note: Only the top five positions are included.

Attendance
Attendance at the 3 day race weekend was 151,426 people with over 65,000 fans attending the Champ Car raceday main event. This represented a 28% increase over 2006.

References

External links
 Full Weekend Times & Results
 Race Box Score

Cleveland
Grand Prix of Cleveland
Grand Prix of Cleveland